Breyan Isaac (born May 24, 1980) is an American singer, songwriter, producer, and pianist based in Daytona Beach, Florida. He has written, produced, and performed on songs by a number of artists including, David Guetta, Flo Rida, Pitbull, Wiz Khalifa, Nicki Minaj, Charlie Puth, G-Eazy, Waka Flocka Flame, Lecrae, and others.

Isaac has also received five consecutive awards for songwriting from BMI between 2013 and 2017, and was ranked the 76th best songwriter and producer in the world in 2015 by SS100. In 2018, he won the Grammy Award for Best Reggae Album for his work on Damian Marley's Stony Hill. He has publishing deals with Mike Caren's Artist Publishing Group and BMG and is managed by SAL&CO. He also runs a production company with Dre Marshall.

Early life

Isaac was born in the Roxbury neighborhood of Boston, Massachusetts. As a child, he relocated to Fort Lauderdale, Florida after his father found a better job there. In his youth, Isaac was a worship leader in church.

Career

Isaac began his career in earnest after moving to Daytona Beach, Florida. He was invited by a friend to do some sessions with Flo Rida and would continue to work with him thereafter. That work eventually led Isaac to his first placement, "Good Feeling." That song, which peaked at No. 3 on the Billboard Hot 100, would later be released on Flo Rida's 2012 album, Wild Ones. Isaac co-wrote 4 songs on that album, including "Good Feeling" and "Whistle" the latter of which went to No. 1 on the Billboard Hot 100 chart.

The following year, he co-wrote "Timber" by Pitbull featuring Kesha. That song would also top the Hot 100 chart and go multi-platinum in several countries. In 2015, he co-wrote Charlie Puth's "One Call Away" for which he would go on to win a BMI Pop Award (his fifth in as many years).

In 2016 and 2017, he worked on a variety of movie soundtrack songs, including Lecrae's "River of Jordan" from The Shack, Nick Jonas and Nicki Minaj's "Bom Bidi Bom" from Fifty Shades Darker, and Lil Uzi Vert, Quavo, and Travis Scott's "Go Off" from The Fate of the Furious. In 2017, he worked on Damian Marley's "Medication," the lead single off of his album, Stony Hill. The album would go on to win the Grammy Award for Best Reggae Album in 2018.

Discography

References

External links
Official website
Artist Publishing Group Profile

Living people
African-American record producers
American hip hop record producers
Musicians from Florida
1980 births
21st-century African-American people
20th-century African-American people